Antara may refer to:

 Antara (music), a verse in Hindustani classical music
 Antara (musical instrument), or siku, a traditional Andean panpipe
 Antara (news agency), an Indonesian news agency
 Antara (Peru), a mountain in Peru
 Antara Polanco, an upscale shopping mall in Polanco, Mexico City
 Antara Gange, a mountain in Karnataka, India
 Opel Antara, a sport utility vehicle developed by GM Korea, and sold as Opel and Vauxhall
 Fenofibrate, a prescription drug used for lowering triglycerides and cholesterol
 Antara (hospital), a mental hospital located in Kolkata, India

People

 Antara Chowdhury (born 1991), singer and composer of Bengali songs
 Antarah ibn Shaddad (525–608), pre-Islamic Arabian poet
 Antara Mali (born 1979), Indian actress
 Antara Mitra (born 1987), Indian playback singer
 Antara Dev Sen (born 1963), British–Indian journalist

See also
 Antar (disambiguation)